Piorkowski is a Polish surname.  Notable people with the surname include:

Alexander Piorkowski (1904–1948), German Nazi SS concentration camp commandant executed for war crimes
Daniel Piorkowski (born 1984), Australian footballer

Polish-language surnames